Gambacorta Peak is a peak,  high, standing  east of Mount Kaschak in the southern Neptune Range, Pensacola Mountains, Antarctica. It was mapped by the United States Geological Survey from surveys and U.S. Navy air photos from 1956 to 1966. It was named by the Advisory Committee on Antarctic Names for Captain Francis M. Gambacorta, captain of the USS Wyandot that transported the party which established Ellsworth Station at the outset of the International Geophysical Year. Unloading at the station site on the Filchner Ice Shelf began January 29, 1957.

References

Mountains of Queen Elizabeth Land
Pensacola Mountains